This is a follow list of the MTV Movie Award winners and nominees for Most Desirable Male. This award was last given out in 1996, along with its counterpart, Most Desirable Female.

MTV Movie & TV Awards